Sobeknakht II was an ancient Egyptian local Governor at El-Kab and a supporter of the Theban 16th or 17th Dynasty during the Second Intermediate Period.

Biography
Not much is known about Sobeknakht's life. He was the son of Sobeknakht I as well as his successor as governor of El-Kab. His father obtained this charge from a relative called Kebsi, who sold it in order to settle his personal debts. This trade is documented by the Juridical Stela, which was issued in Year 1 of the Theban pharaoh Nebiryraw I specifically for that purpose.

Sobeknakht II was buried in the Tomb T10 at El-Kab, which is one of the best preserved and most richly decorated tombs of the Egyptian Second Intermediate Period. It is hewn out of the sandstone rock cliffs and consists of two rectangular chambers connected by a central doorway. The burial shaft is sunk into the floor of the innermost chamber, the walls of which are left blank unlike the outer chamber. Decorations include Sobeknakht with his wife and children and a number of monkeys in various poses and activities, such as eating food from the deceased's offering table.

Tomb discovery and archeology
The tomb was discovered in the 19th century; however, it was neglected.

In 2003, in response to concerns about its deterioration, his tomb was cleaned by British Egyptologists and was found to contain an 22-line inscription with important historical significance. The inscription was made with red paint on the doorway between the two internal chambers.

It records a massive Nubian invasion, aided by peoples from the land of Punt and the Medjay, on the small and fragile 16th or 17th Dynasty city state of Thebes. Sobeknakht II claims to have strengthened El-Kab's defenses, mustered a fighting force, and launched a counter-attack, which was victorious due to the aid of the vulture-goddess Nekhbet A celebration is attended by an unnamed Egyptian king, and Sobeknakht endows the temple of Nekhbet with "a new sacred barque worked in electrum."

A vessel with Sobeknakht's name was discovered in Sudan, which seems to corroborate the events depicted. It also hints that Sobeknakht's tomb had already been filled and finished by the time of the invasion, and that the red text was added as a late addition to reflect these new events in his life, the corridor being the only remaining space left to complete such a task.

Datation
In addition to reporting the trade of the governorship of El-Kab from Kebsi to Sobeknakht I (father of Sobeknakht II), the aforementioned Cairo Juridical stela contains an important genealogical charter which states that Kebsi inherited the title of governor from his father Ayameru when the latter in turn inherited the vizierate from his father Aya. Now, Ayameru was appointed governor of El-Kab in Year 1 of the 13th Dynasty king Merhotepre Ini. This means that a period of only two family generations, or about 40–60 years at most, separate Year 1 of the 13th Dynasty king Merhotepre Ini from Year 1 of the 16th-dynasty king Nebiryraw I, the latter of whom is assigned a reign of 26 years in the Turin Canon.

References

Further reading
Joseph John Tylor (1896), Wall drawings and monuments of El Kab. The tomb of Sebeknekht.

Nomarchs
People of the Sixteenth Dynasty of Egypt
Officials of the Seventeenth Dynasty of Egypt